Sir David de Villiers Graaff, 3rd Baronet (3 May 194024 January 2015), was a South African businessman and owner of De Grendel Wine Estate.

The son of Sir De Villiers Graaff, 2nd Baronet, he was born in 1940, after his father left to serve in the North African Campaign. Sir De Villiers became a prisoner of war in 1942, and would not meet his son until 1945. David took his undergraduate degree BSC Agric University of Stellenbosch, preparatory to a career in politics and farming, but also read politics, philosophy and economics at Magdalen College, Oxford and studied at the University of Grenoble. Like his father, he entered South African politics and served as Deputy Minister of Trade and Industry under FW De Klerk, he retired in 1996. When he inherited the baronetcy and the family estate of De Grendel upon his father's death, he decided to experiment with viniculture and winemaking. Sir David was a director of Graaffs Trust and The Milnerton Estates Limited.

He was the Honorary Colonel of the Cape Garrison Artillery until his death on 24 January 2015.

Sir David is survived by his wife Sally and his four children, the eldest of whom, De Villiers, succeeded him in the baronetcy and farming at De Grendel Estate.

References

Baronets in the Baronetage of the United Kingdom
Viticulturists
1940 births
2015 deaths
People from the Western Cape
Afrikaner people
Government ministers of South Africa
David
Alumni of Magdalen College, Oxford
Stellenbosch University alumni
Grenoble Alpes University alumni
People from Cape Town